Phelps House may refer to:

in the United States 
(by state, then city)

Phelps-Jones House, Huntsville, Alabama, listed on the National Register of Historic Places (NRHP) in Huntsville, Alabama
Abner Phelps House, San Francisco, California, listed on the NRHP in San Francisco, California
Phelps Farms Historic District, Colebrook, Connecticut, listed on the NRHP in Litchfield County, Connecticut
Ezekiel Phelps House, East Granby, Connecticut, NRHP-listed
Arah Phelps Inn, North Colebrook, Connecticut, listed on the NRHP in Litchfield County, Connecticut
Capt. Elisha Phelps House, Simsbury, Connecticut, NRHP-listed
Eli Phelps House, Windsor, Connecticut, listed on the NRHP in Hartford County, Connecticut
 Seth Ledyard Phelps House, Washington, DC, listed on the NRHP in Washington, DC
Alexis Phelps House, Oquawka, Illinois, NRHP-listed
Porter-Phelps-Huntington House, Hadley, Massachusetts, NRHP-listed
Phelps House (North Adams, Massachusetts), listed on the National Register of Historic Places in Berkshire County, Massachusetts
Laflin-Phelps Homestead, Southwick, Massachusetts, NRHP-listed
Phelps Country Estate, Carthage, Missouri, listed on the NRHP in Jasper County, Missouri
Phelps Mansion, Binghamton, New York, NRHP-listed
Ezra T. Phelps Farm Complex, Marion, New York, NRHP-listed
Dubois-Phelps House, Montgomery, New York, NRHP-listed
Stephen Phelps House, Penfield, New York, NRHP-listed
Phelps House (Aiken, South Carolina), NRHP-listed